Vlahovtsi is a former settlement in Gabrovo Municipality, in Gabrovo Province, in northern central Bulgaria. It has been uninhabited since 1975.

References

Villages in Gabrovo Province
Former populated places in Bulgaria